The  Washington Redskins season was the franchise's 24th season in the National Football League (NFL) and their 19th in Washington, D.C.  The team  improved on their 3–9 record from 1954 and finished 8-4.

Offseason

NFL Draft

Regular season

Schedule

Standings

Roster

Awards, records, and honors

References

Washington
Washington Redskins seasons
Washing